Nicolau Borges (born 20 January 1979) is a former Indian professional footballer who plays as a left back.

Career

Early career
Born in Goa, Borges started his career at a Goa Football Association U15 camp. He also played in a few inter-village tournaments as well as a few amateur Goan teams before joining Sporting Clube de Goa in 2004. He spent three seasons at Sporting Goa before joining Dempo of the I-League in 2007. While with Dempo, Borges helped the club win the I-League three times.

Then, during the summer of 2013, it was confirmed that Borges had signed for Mohun Bagan after being released by Dempo. However, on 5 December 2013, it was announced that Borges had been released by Mohun Bagan.

Pune
On 13 January 2014, it was announced that Borges had signed for Pune of the I-League on loan from Mohun Bagan.

References

External links 
 I-League Profile.

1979 births
Living people
Indian footballers
Sporting Clube de Goa players
Dempo SC players
Mohun Bagan AC players
Pune FC players
Association football defenders
Footballers from Goa
I-League players